Banca Marche Palace ( or PalaRossini) is an indoor sports arena, located in Ancona, Italy. The capacity is 6,500 people.

It has hosted some matches of the 2010 FIVB Men's World Championship.

References

Indoor arenas in Italy
Ancona
Sports venues in Marche